is a Japanese author, best known for the Boogiepop series which has received multiple manga adaptations, a live action film, and two television anime.

Biography 
Born on December 12, 1968, Kadono graduated from Hosei University. 

In 1998, his light novel Boogiepop and Others won the Fourth Dengeki Novel Prize and was later adapted into a manga that was illustrated by Kouji Ogata. An anime spin-off of the Boogiepop series, Boogiepop Phantom, aired in 2000 animated by Madhouse and an anime adaptation of the series was released in 2019 by the same studio.

Works

Boogiepop series 
 Boogiepop Novels
Boogiepop and Others
Boogiepop Returns: VS Imaginator Part 1
Boogiepop Returns: VS Imaginator Part 2
Boogiepop in the Mirror: Pandora
Boogiepop Overdrive: The King of Distortion
Boogiepop at Dawn
Boogiepop Missing: Peppermint Wizard
Boogiepop Countdown Embryo: Erosion
Boogiepop Wicked Embryo: Eruption
Boogiepop Paradox: Heartless Red
Boogiepop Unbalance: Holy & Ghost
Boogiepop Stacatto: Welcome to Jinx Shop
Boogiepop Bounding: Lost Moebius
Boogiepop Intolerance: The Ark of Orpheus
Boogiepop Question: The Silent Pyramid
Boogiepop Darkly: The Scat Singing Cat
Boogiepop Unknown: Into The Lunar Rainbow
Boogiepop Within: Paradigm Rust
Boogiepop Changeling: Stalking in Decadent Black
Boogiepop Antithesis: Revolt of Alternative Ego
Boogiepop Beautiful: The Kingcraft of Panic-Cute
Boogie Pop Almighty: When Dizzy Thinks of Lizzy
 Beat's Discipline
Beat's Discipline Side 1[Exile]
Beat's Discipline Side 2[Fracture]
Beat's Discipline Side 3[Providence]
Beat's Discipline Side 4[Indiscipline]
 Repent Walpurgis
 Repent Walpurgis Fire 1[Warning Witch]
 Repent Walpurgis Fire 2[Spitting Witch]
 Repent Walpurgis Fire 3[Dozing Witch]
 Repent Walpurgis Fire 4[freezing witch]
 The Emperoider
 The Emperoider Spin 1[Wormy Empire]
 The Emperoider Spin 2[Gravelly Empire]
 The Emperoider Spin 3[Haunted Empire]
 The Emperoider Spin 4[Fallen Empire]
 Short Stories
Metal Guru
London Calling
My Death Waits
Boogiepop Poplife
Chariot Choogle
Angel Volume

Tokuma Dual 
 Night Watch Trilogy
The Night Watch into the Night Yawn
The Night Watch under The Cold Moon (VS Imaginator Part IV)
The Night Watch against the Star-Crossed Star
 Novel 21 Shonen no Jikan (anthology)
Controversy about Iron Mask (short story)

Kodansha 
 Jiken series
A Case of Dragonslayer
Inside the Apocalypse Castle
The Man in Pirate's Island
Some Tragedies of No-Tear Land
The cruel tale of ZANKOKU-GO
Injustice of innocent princess
Beyond The Dragon's Skies

 Faust
Outlandos d'amour
Jagtiger (Porsche Laufwerk
When Hornet Says Leb'wohl

 Mephisto
Dragonfly in the Sky with Gold
Eyes of Guignol, or Outside the Castle
A Spoon of Jackpot
Masque of Veiled Man
Snows in Dragon's Teeth

 Mystery Land
No Oxygen, Not To Be Mirrored

Shizuru-san series

The Eccentric Dead in White Sickroom

 is the first novel in the Shizurusan series written by Kadono and illustrated by Kaya Kuramoto. It tells four stories of two girls and one short story about a fictional character created by the girls.

All of Kadono's works are linked together to a greater or lesser degree. The Shizuru-san series is particularly connected with Boogiepop Unblance: Holy & Ghost.

Plot summary

""There is no mysterious mystery but "deception" there – .""
The beauty girl who lives a life bedridden in a hospital challenges mysterious incidents which spread over the world by the cool pupil and sharp insight with a partner.

Characters
 (Real-name is unknown.)
A familiar face of the hospital in which Shizuru-san is, and her best friend. She comes for Shizuru frequently to see and talk to because she herself is pleasant.

A beauty attached and interested severely in cruel incidents which Yo wants to avert her eyes and the intricately complicated mystery. The incidents in which she got interested are solved one after another only by her reading data, without her moving from the hospital. The incident she indicates interest is unsolvable by any means, if it is thought using ordinary common sense. During guessing she is indifferent to Yo's feeling, although she is usually so gentle that she wants Yo not to have a decadent idea. She always remains calm. She never utters loud voice and does not talk rapidly.

Sewing-basis which Yo was loving once. Yo and Shizuru make him into a hero and collaborate with each other in telling one story.

Other works in series
The Bottomless Closed-Rooms in the Limited World
The Silent Princess in the Unprincipled Tales
The Cavalier Bleeds for the Blood

Soul Drop series 
Spectral Speculation of Soul-Drop
Phantasm Phenomenon of Memoria-Noise
Labyrinthine Linkage of Maze-Prison
The Deprived Proof of Topolo-Shadow
The Screened Script of Crypt-Mask
Infinity Inference of Out-Gap
Remote Thinking of Cogito-Pinocchio

Other works 
The Dance with Pluto and Beast
Clockwork Serpents
Questions & Answers of Me & Devil in 100
Like Toy Soldiers
Zero Trillion in Pangaea
Shameless Purple Haze -JoJo's Bizarre Adventure- Purple Haze Feedback
JoJo's Bizarre Adventure: Crazy Diamond's Demonic Heartbreak

References 

 Kouhei Kadono at Hatena Diary (in Japanese)
 Opus List of Kouhei Kadono (in Japanese)

1968 births
20th-century Japanese novelists
21st-century Japanese novelists
Living people
Light novelists
Boogiepop
Hosei University alumni